Sir William Murray McPherson, KBE (17 September 1865 – 26 July 1932) was an Australian philanthropist and politician. He was the 31st Premier of Victoria.

Early life and philanthropy
He was born in Melbourne, the son of a prosperous Scottish-born merchant, and worked in his father's business, eventually becoming sole proprietor and managing director of McPherson's, a leading machinery firm. A very wealthy man by the early years of the 20th century, he was President of the Melbourne Chamber of Commerce 1907–09. In 1892 he married Emily Jackson, with whom he had three children. In 1927 he donated £25,000 to found the Emily McPherson School of Domestic Economy, named for his wife (today, as Emily McPherson College, it is part of RMIT University). He also funded the Jessie McPherson section (named for his mother) of the now-demolished Queen Victoria Hospital.

Politics
McPherson was elected to the Victorian Legislative Assembly for the seat of Hawthorn in 1913. He was Treasurer in the Nationalist governments of John Bowser and Harry Lawson from 1917 to 1923, and developed a reputation as a very conservative manager of the state's finances. It was McPherson's refusal to provide funds for pensions for members of the Victoria Police that sparked the 1923 Victorian Police strike. He was appointed a Knight Commander of the Order of the British Empire (KBE) in 1923 for service as Treasurer.

Premier of Victoria

In 1927 McPherson succeeded Alexander Peacock as leader of the Nationalist Party. In November 1928 he moved a vote of no confidence against Ned Hogan's minority Labor Party government, which had lost the support of the independent members who were keeping it in office, and as a result he became Premier. His Cabinet included two bright young Nationalist politicians who were destined for higher things: Robert Menzies and Wilfrid Kent Hughes. But in July 1929 both these men joined a Cabinet revolt over McPherson's uncharacteristic agreement to offer an open-ended subsidy to rural meat-freezing works (this was a bid to win over rural independent MPs).

As a result of this and similar examples of unsustained government spending to buy off rural interest groups, Victoria by 1929 had amassed a public debt of over a million pounds, a huge amount at the time. This provoked McPherson into proposing cuts to public spending, which in turn led the country members who held the balance of power to withdraw their support from McPherson's government. As a result, he called an election at which the Nationalists won 17 seats and the Country Party 11, while Labor won 30, with seven independents.

Later life
McPherson refused to resign, but was defeated in a vote of no confidence when the new Parliament met in December. Hogan then formed a new government. McPherson resigned as Nationalist leader, and from politics, in August 1930.

He died suddenly in July 1932, aged 66.

References

Geoff Browne, A Biographical Register of the Victorian Parliament, 1900–84, Government Printer, Melbourne, 1985
Don Garden, Victoria: A History, Thomas Nelson, Melbourne, 1984
Kate White, John Cain and Victorian Labour 1917–1957, Hale and Iremonger, Sydney, 1982
Raymond Wright, A People's Counsel. A History of the Parliament of Victoria, 1856–1990, Oxford University Press, Melbourne, 1992

External links
Emily McPherson College

1865 births
1932 deaths
Premiers of Victoria
Treasurers of Victoria
Leaders of the Opposition in Victoria (Australia)
Members of the Victorian Legislative Assembly
Politicians from Melbourne
Victoria (Australia) state politicians
Philanthropists from Melbourne
RMIT University people
Australian people of Scottish descent
Australian Knights Commander of the Order of the British Empire
Australian politicians awarded knighthoods
Nationalist Party of Australia members of the Parliament of Victoria
People from West Melbourne, Victoria